There are two municipalities of Switzerland named Teufen:
Teufen, Appenzell Ausserrhoden
Freienstein-Teufen in the district of Bülach in the Canton of Zurich

de:Teufen AR